Yesipovo is a rural locality (a village) in Chertkovskoye Rural Settlement, Selivanovsky District, Vladimir Oblast, Russia. The population was 23 as of 2010.

Mercedes-Benz has opened a factory called Mosvocia (its first in Russia) near Yesipovo in April 2019.

Geography 
Yesipovo is located on the Kestromka River, 7 km north of Krasnaya Gorbatka (the district's administrative centre) by road. Voshchikha is the nearest rural locality.

References 

Rural localities in Selivanovsky District